Events from the year 1795 in Denmark.

Incumbents
 Monarch – Christian VII
 Prime minister – Andreas Peter Bernstorff

Events

 5 June – The Copenhagen Fire of 1795 breaks out around 3 p.m. at the Navy’s old base at Gammelholm.
 7 June – The fire dies out around 4 p.m. It has destroyed 941 houses and made homeless around 6,000 residents.

Undated
 The Leda and the Swan statue in Copenhagen Harbour is dismantled.

Births
 16 January – Carl Christian Rafn, historian, translator and antiquarian (died 1864)
 4 May - Annestine Beyer, reform pedagogue and pioneer on women's education  (died 1884)
 8 December – Peter Andreas Hansen, astronomer, Copley Medal recipient in 1850 (died 1874)
 9 December – Mathias Lüttichau, Danish Minister of War (died 1870)
 13 December – Just Mathias Thiele, writer and art historian (died 1874)
 31 December – Carl Peter Holbøll, naval officer and Greenland explorer (died 1856)

Deaths
 3 January – Hans Næss, architect (born 1723)
 20 July  – Niels Lunde Reiersen, government official businessman (born 1742)
 17 August – Friderich Christian Hager, governor of the Danish Gold Coast (born 1756)
 Caroline von Schimmelmann, favorite (born 1730)

References

 
1790s in Denmark
Years of the 18th century in Denmark